Edward J. O'Neil (born March 11, 1859 in Fall River, Massachusetts; died September 30, 1892 in Fall River, Massachusetts) was a pitcher in Major League Baseball. He played parts of the  season for two different teams in the American Association.

Sources

1859 births
1892 deaths
Baseball players from Massachusetts
Major League Baseball pitchers
19th-century baseball players
Toledo Maumees players
Philadelphia Athletics (AA) players
Sportspeople from Fall River, Massachusetts
Minneapolis Millers (baseball) players
Shenandoah Hungarian Rioters players
Dallas Hams players
Oakland Colonels players
Oakland Morans players
Seattle Reds players